Cuba competed at the 1948 Summer Olympics in London, England.  It was the first time in 20 years that Cuban athletes competed at the Olympic Games. 53 competitors, all men, took part in 31 events in 12 sports.

Medalists

Athletics

Basketball

Cycling

One male cyclist represented Cuba in 1948.

Sprint
 Reinaldo Paseiro

Time trial
 Reinaldo Paseiro

Diving

Fencing

Six fencers, all men, represented Cuba in 1948.

Men's foil
 Armando Barrientos
 Lucilo de la Peña
 Jorge Agostini

Men's épée
 Roberto Mañalich
 Carlos Lamar

Men's team épée
 Roberto Mañalich, Carlos Lamar, Armando Barrientos, Juan Antonio Martínez

Men's sabre
 Roberto Mañalich
 Juan Antonio Martínez

Gymnastics

Rowing

Cuba had five male rowers participate in one out of seven rowing events in 1948.

 Men's coxed four
 Ramón Cora
 Joaquin Godoy
 Manuel Puig
 Ramón Puig
 Tirso del Junco (cox)

Sailing

Shooting

Seven shooters represented Cuba in 1948.

25 metre pistol
 Hernando Hernández
 Rafael Cadalso
 Carlos Rodríguez-Feo

50 metre pistol
 Godofredo Basso
 Enrique Tejeda

50 metre rifle
 Orlando Santamaría
 Wilfredo Coto

Swimming

Men's 100 metres Freestyle
Nicasio Silverio
Raúl García

Weightlifting

Wrestling

References

External links
Official Olympic Reports
International Olympic Committee results database

Nations at the 1948 Summer Olympics
1948
1948 in Cuban sport